The discography of Bulevar, a Serbian new wave group from Belgrade, consists of two singles, two studio albums, the 1981 Loš i mlad (Bad and young) and 1982 Mala noćna panika (A little night panic), a compilation album, Nestašni dečaci (Wild boys), released in 2008, featuring the remastered versions of the two studio albums and the second single, as well as several appearances on various artists compilations.

Studio albums

Compilation albums

Singles

Other appearances

References 

 EX YU ROCK enciklopedija 1960-2006, Janjatović Petar; 

Discographies of Serbian artists
Rock music group discographies